The 63rd Bodil Awards were held on 21 March 2010 in the Imperial Cinema in Copenhagen, Denmark, honouring the best national and foreign films of 2009. Lasse Rimmer hosted the event. Lars von Triers Antichrist was the big winner, receiving both the awards for Best Danish Film, Best Actor (Willem Dafoe), Best Actress (Charlotte Gainsbourg), Best Cinematographer (Anthony Dod Mantle) and a Special Award to Eidnes Andersen for sound design. Deliver Us from Evil won both the awards for Best Supporting Actor and Best Supporting Actress while Headhunter which had come to the ceremony with the most nominations, five in three categories, left empty-handed. The documentary The Invisible Cell about The Blekinge Street Gang won the award for Best Documentary. Carsten Myllerup, Linda Krogsøe Holmberg and Jens Mikkelsen received a Bodil Honorary Award for their role in the foundation of the alternative film school Super16.

Winners 
 Bodil Honorary Award – Carsten Myllerup, Linda Krogsøe Holmberg and Jens Mikkelsen

See also 

 2010 Robert Awards

References

External links 
 Official website

2009 film awards
Bodil Awards ceremonies
2010 in Copenhagen
March 2010 events in Europe